Choerades gilvus  is a Palearctic species of robber fly in the family Asilidae.

References

External links
Geller Grim Robberflies of Germany
 Images representing Choerades gilvus 

Asilidae
Flies described in 1758
Taxa named by Carl Linnaeus
Asilomorph flies of Europe